Neder Randlev is a village in Jutland, Denmark. It is located in Odder Municipality.

References

Odder Municipality
Cities and towns in the Central Denmark Region
Villages in Denmark